Gowar may refer to:

 Gowar Riding, a ward in the Shire of Maldon, Victoria, Australia.
 Ghawar Field, a gigantic oil field in Saudi Arabia.

Goward
 Ernest Goward, Indian cricketer 
 Pru Goward, Australian politician
 Russell Goward, American politician
 Ryan Goward, English footballer